Bsisa (Berber aḍemmin 
) is a typical Mediterranean food, based on flour of roasted barley which dates back to Roman times. 

Bsisa is a variety of mixtures of roasted cereals ground with fenugreek and aniseed and cumin and sugar. This kind of food is known throughout Tunisia and Libya. Its history goes back a long way, and travellers and nomads used to take bsisa with them on their journeys since it was both full of nutritional value and easy to carry in its ground powder form.

The herbs and spices that are added to the mixture can vary, and the mixtures can also be used as a liquid when added to milk or water, creating a strongly floured drink called Rowina. The most common use for bsisa is to mix them with olive oil into a paste. This is then typically eaten with dates or figs for a quick meal which is energy-rich and healthy. 'Howira' is a similar mixture to Bsisa, however of a darker complexion and consists of similar ingredients.

It is eaten by Tunisian and Libyan muslims and Jews on various occasions, and especially the first day of the Hebrew month of Nisan as this is the day the Mishkan (tabernacle) was erected (in this case, the food is named bsiset el-marquma or simply Bsisa). The food is powder that consists of wheat and barley, which represents the mortar used to build the Mishkan. Additionally, the mother of the household puts her gold ring into the Bsisa, recalling the gold that was also used in the building of the Mishkan. Before eating the bsisa, the father of the household blesses in Arabic while he mixes the Bsisa using the key to his house with oil, recalling the oil used in the Mishkan  This symbolizes the "opening" of the 'new year' The father and family recite in turn:

Ya fetach,
Bla Neftach,
Arzekna warzek menna
Ya atai,
Bla mena!

Notes

See also 
 Tsampa, a similar Tibetan staple
 Arab cuisine
 Cuisine of Tunisia
 Cuisine of Libya
 Cuisine of the Sephardic Jews

Arab cuisine
Moroccan cuisine
African cuisine
Mediterranean cuisine
Tunisian cuisine
Libyan cuisine

Sephardi Jewish cuisine
Jews and Judaism in Tunisia
Jews and Judaism in Libya